Sabri Kaliç (May 19, 1966 in Izmir, Turkey – September 23, 2012 in Izmir) is a Turkish film director, experimental filmmaker, writer and translator.

After receiving his BFA in film directing from the Dokuz Eylül University in Izmir, he moved to Istanbul in 1992. Having worked with Turkish film director Sinan Çetin as an assistant for a while, he made his TV film debut with Midnight Hitchhiker in 1995. He also translated screenplays from English, including that of Trainspotting.

Filmography
 A Fassbinder Lie – 1987 (1/24 second {1 frame!}, 16 mm., b/w), supposedly the world's shortest film
 PO"y"EM – 1987 (4 seconds, 16 mm., b/w)
 Not The Longest Film You Will Ever See, But... – 1987 (1 second, 16 mm., b/w)
 59" – 1987 (59 seconds, 16 mm., b/w)
 Bolero – 1990 (17 min., VHS, color)
 Das ist Eine Video-Kunst – 1991 (13 min., VHS, color)
 Keine Kunst Bitte – 1991 (9 min., VHS, color)
 Douche Opera – 1992 (5 min., VHS, color)
 Midnight Hitchhiker – 1995 (87 min, BETACAM, color)
 The Spider Web – 1998 (92 min., BETACAM, color) 
 Sabri Kaliç : CV- 2000 (27 min., BETACAM, color) 
 Midnight Stories – 2000 (85 min., BETACAM, color) 
 Non – 2002 (no color, no format)
 Stories From Beyond – 2005 (62 min., BETACAM, color) 
 Stories From Beyond -II – 2005 (59 min., BETACAM, color)

Awards
 1987 Ankara Film Festival Invitation 
 1992 Adana Student Films Festival Invitation 
 1992 A Concise History of Experimental Film – Turkish Ministry of Culture "Cinema Book of the Year" Award
 1996 Moths Towards The Fire – Turkish Ministry of Culture "Script of the Year" Award
 1996 Spaghetti With Yogurt – Orhon Murat Ariburnu "Best Film Story" Award
 2005 Meta-Film Award – Experimental Film Award delivered by Meta-Film Underground, Holland
 2010 The Monk and The Butterfly – Screenplay Writing Fund for the film story

References

1966 births
2012 deaths
People from İzmir
Turkish film directors
Turkish film producers
Turkish writers